Amiens Street is a road in Dublin, Ireland, that runs from Memorial Road to North Strand.

History
The road was known as The Strand in the early 18th century. It was renamed after John Stratford, 1st Earl of Aldborough (Viscount Amiens) in 1877, but only to the eastern end. The entire street was named after the Earl in 1829.

It is one of the most frequented streets by railway passengers using Dublin Connolly station, formerly Amiens Street station, which opened in 1844. The Italianate architecture of the Dublin and Drogheda Railway station buildings are the focal point. In 1966, the station was renamed after the General Post Office Commandant James Connolly who was executed for his role in the Easter Rising.

The street was one of the boundaries of Dublin's red-light district, Monto, that existed between the 1860s and 1920s.

As part of a wider set of proposals to rename a number of Dublin streets in 1921, it was proposed that Amiens Street be renamed Bohernatra (Strand Road) along with North Strand, in a report by the Dublin Corporation street naming committee. This new naming scheme was not implemented, despite the Corporation voting in favour.

The street links the International Financial Services Centre and the Custom House Quay across the tramlines of the LUAS where there is street level tram terminal and interchange for the trains in Dublin Connolly. Across the road over the pedestrian crossing is Talbot Street. Further up the street with an over bridge carrying the DART (en route to Tara Street across the Liffey) over the street to the North Strand Road heading towards Fairview.

Aldborough House sits at the junction of Amiens Street at North Strand, and was constructed in 1796 for Viscount Amiens. The house was one of the last significant 18th-century constructions in Dublin, costing £40,000.

The 19th-century Irish novelist Charles Lever was born in No. 35 Amiens Street.

See also
List of streets and squares in Dublin

References
Citations

Sources

External links
1846 Connolly Station, Amiens Street, Dublin Archiseek.com
Tourist-Information-Dublin

Streets in Dublin (city)